The Marchhorn is a mountain of the Lepontine Alps, located on the Swiss-Italian border. On its northwest side it overlooks the San Giacomo Pass.

References

External links
 Marchhorn on Hikr

Mountains of the Alps
Mountains of Switzerland
Mountains of Italy
Italy–Switzerland border
International mountains of Europe
Mountains of Ticino
Lepontine Alps